Kullar (Qullar) is a rural locality (a selo) in Derbentsky District, Republic of Dagestan, Russia. The population was 2,313 as of 2010. There are 59 streets.

Geography 
Kullar is located 28 km south of Derbent (the district's administrative centre) by road. Kartas-Kazmalyar and Kumuk are the nearest rural localities.

Nationalities 
Lezgins, Tabasarans and Azerbaijanis live there.

References 

Rural localities in Derbentsky District